3-Hexanone (ethyl propyl ketone) is an organic compound with the formula C6H12O. It is a ketone used as a solvent and as a chemical intermediate.

Preparation

3-Hexanone can be obtained by oxidation of 3-hexanol:

It is also the product of the Grignard reaction of propylmagnesium bromide with propionitrile:

Isomers
 2-Methyl-3-pentanone (Ethyl isopropyl ketone)

References

Hexanones